Fana Ashby (born 15 June 1981) is a retired athlete from Trinidad and Tobago who specialised in the sprinting events. She represented her country at two consecutive Summer Olympics, starting in 2000. She won the bronze medal in the 100 metres at the 2000 World Junior Championships.

Ashby was coached by coach Henry Rolle.

Competition record

Personal bests
Outdoor
100 metres – 11.12 (Port-of-Spain 2004)
200 metres – 23.05 (Port-of-Spain 2003)
Indoor
60 metres – 7.18 (Fayetteville 2005)
200 metres – 22.91 (Fayetteville 2005)

References

1981 births
Living people
Trinidad and Tobago female sprinters
Athletes (track and field) at the 2000 Summer Olympics
Athletes (track and field) at the 2004 Summer Olympics
Athletes (track and field) at the 2003 Pan American Games
Athletes (track and field) at the 2007 Pan American Games
Athletes (track and field) at the 2002 Commonwealth Games
Athletes (track and field) at the 2006 Commonwealth Games
Olympic athletes of Trinidad and Tobago
Commonwealth Games competitors for Trinidad and Tobago
Pan American Games competitors for Trinidad and Tobago
Olympic female sprinters
Auburn Tigers women's track and field athletes
Auburn University alumni